Performance Aircraft was an American aircraft manufacturer based in Olathe, Kansas. The company specialized in the design and manufacture of light aircraft in the form of kits for amateur construction.

The company produced two all-composite construction designs, the two-seats in side-by-side configuration Performance Aircraft Formula GT and the tandem-seat Performance Aircraft Legend.

The company seems to have gone out of business in late 2001.

Aircraft

References

External links
Company website archives on Archive.org

Defunct aircraft manufacturers of the United States
Homebuilt aircraft